Adendorp is a village 8 km south of Graaff-Reinet, in the Sundays River Valley. Named after the former owner of the farm, N J Adendorff, who sub-divided it into smallholdings in about 1858. Municipal status was attained in 1878.

References

Populated places in the Dr Beyers Naudé Local Municipality